No. 138 Expeditionary Air Wing RAF specialises in the Fighter & Ground Attack role and is currently based at RAF Marham.

No. 138 Wing fought with the Second Tactical Air Force in North-West Europe after D-Day.

Re-formed on 1 April 2006 as an EAW, the Wing is led by the Station Commander of RAF Marham, supported by his Station management team. The deployable elements of the RAF Marham form the core of the EAW, reinforced by assigned Capability-based Module Readiness System (CMRS) personnel and elements of the Air Combat Support Units (ACSUs). 
EAWs enable the RAF to train as cohesive units of Air Power which are prepared and capable of transitioning quickly from peacetime structures and deploying swiftly on operations.

See also
 List of Wings of the Royal Air Force

References

External links
 A list of all RAF Expeditionary Air Wings on the RAF Marham website

E 138
RAF Marham units
Military units and formations established in 2006